Somali is an agglutinative language, using many affixes and particles to determine and alter the meaning of words. As in other related Afroasiatic languages, Somali nouns are inflected for gender, number and case, while verbs are inflected for persons, number, tenses, and moods.

Nouns
Affixes change according to a number of rules.  The definite article is a suffix, with the basic form being -ki or -ka for masculine nouns and -ti or -ta for feminine nouns.  The k or t is the actual article marker, although it can change depending on the preceding consonant, with the following vowel determined by the case of the noun.  Articles do not change for singular or plural.

Absolutive case
The basic form of a Somali noun is in absolutive case.  In this case, the article maintains the vowel -a.

Nominative case
The subject of a sentence takes nominative case.  In this case, the article takes the vowel -u.  If the subject of the sentence includes multiple nouns, only the last takes the nominative ending for the article.

If there is no article, a tonal change signifies nominative case, although this is not represented in the orthography.  Some feminine nouns take the suffix -i in nominative case without an article.

Genitive case
Genitive case is generally indicated through a tonal change.  Some feminine nouns take an ending, -eed, -aad or -od, depending on the final consonant of the root word.

Vocative case
Vocative case is indicated either through a tonal change or with the suffixes -ow (m. sg.), -ohow (m. pl.), -eey/-aay/-ooy (f. sg.) or -yahay (f. pl.).

Gender
Gender is not marked in nouns without the definite article.  The gender of nouns does not follow any particular rule and is not generally obvious.

Number
Nouns form their plural in three ways, including reduplication. Many nouns exhibit gender polarity, whereby they change gender in the plural form, e.g. (the book) is masculine in the singular, but  (the books) is feminine.

Pronouns
Somali personal pronouns exhibit separate clitic and emphatic forms. 

The clitics distinguish a subject and an object form. In the 3rd person non clitic object forms exist. If a transitive verb is used without any overtly expressed object, an object pronoun would need to be added in an English translation. 

The emphatic personal pronouns behave like nouns. The emphatic forms in the table are the basic, unmarked forms (traditionally referred to as absolutive case), and, just like nouns, they all take on the ending -u instead of -a when they function as the non-focused subject of a clause. A focused subject will however be expressed by the basic form listed in the table.

Verbs
Somali verbs consist of a stem to which suffixes are added.  Verbs in indicative mood exist in four tenses, present, present continuous, past and past continuous, in addition to a subjunctive mood form for present and future tense.  Verbs in Somali conjugate mainly through the addition of suffixes, although a very small number of common verbs use a conjugation using prefixes.

Infinitive and verbal nouns
The infinitive is created through the suffix -i or -n depending on verb class, e.g. The infinitive is used in present tense only with the modal verb  (to be able). Verbal nouns are formed with the endings -id, -n and -sho, e.g.

Pareto principle
According to Ahmad (2013), the Pareto principle is in effect with regard to Somali grammar. When applied to Standard Somali, the adjective and verb, which collectively represent around 20% of Somali grammatical categories, would thereby constitute about 80% of both spoken and written Somali. This is due to the fact that tenses have an effect on both grammatical categories.

Indicative mood

Present
Present tense refers to an action which may or may not be happening at present. It may be used to express something which happens habitually or repeatedly.

Past
Past tense is used to describe a completed action in the past with a discrete duration.

nb: The final -ay can also be pronounced and written -ey.

Present continuous
The present continuous tense is formed with the suffix -ay- / -na- (depending on dialect) and the endings from the present tense. The present continuous forms of keen are:

Past continuous
Past continuous is formed with the suffix -na / -ay and the past tense endings: keen+ay+ey = keenayey = I was bringing.  Is it used to describe actions in the past which happened over a period of time:  = While he was reading the newspaper, he was eating breakfast.

Future

Subjunctive mood
The subjunctive is used only in subordinate clauses and certain prepositional phrases. The present subjunctive differs from the indicative only in that the vowel in the endings changes from a to o.

Syntax
Somali has several strategies to indicate where the intention or the interest or the focus is located in the phrase: a topic-comment or focus construction. Each of these focus particles can also be suffixed with the masculine and feminine clitics uu and ay.

Example:

Maxamed baa baxay – Mohamed went out
Sahra ayaa baxday – Sarah went out
Waxaa baxay Maxamed – It was Mohamed who went out 

Also, in the example below note how the noun, focus particle, and verb are each marked for gender. This sort of abundance of gender marking is common and often obligatory in Somali.

Example:

Maxamed wuu baxay – Mohamed went out
Sahro way baxday – Sarah went out

In this case, the question would be "(Subject) did what?", this time answerable by the verb.

Also, it is not obligatory for gender clitics to be attached to the corresponding focus particle. Often they are simply placed after the particle. This sort of marking is often seen in rural dialects and in literature while the combined marking is often seen in city dialects, although it is very common to see both regardless of location and register. 

Sentences in Somali are typically of the order Subject-Object-Verb (SOV).  Nouns have different tonal markings for number, gender (masculine and feminine), and case or role in the sentence.

See also
Somali alphabet

Notes

References
Andrzejewski, B.W.  The Case System in Somali.  London: 1979.
Andrzejewski, B.W.  The Declensions of Somali Nouns.  London:  1964.
Bell, C.R.V.  The Somali Language.  New York: 1969.
Kirk, J.W.C.  A grammar of the Somali language, with examples in prose and verse, and an account of the Yibir and Midgan dialects.  Cambridge [Eng.]:  1905.
Saeed, John I.  Somali Reference Grammar.  Kensington, Md.:  1993.
Saeed, John I.  Syntax of Focus & Topic in Somali.  Hamburg:  1984.
El-Solami-Mewis, Catherine.  Lehrbuch des Somali.  Leipzig, 1987.

External links
Nilsson. 2020. Beginner's Somali Grammar. University of Gothenburg.

Afroasiatic grammars
Somali language